The Lelwel hartebeest (Alcelaphus buselaphus lelwel), also known as Jackson's hartebeest, is an antelope native to Central African Republic, Chad, the Democratic Republic of the Congo, Ethiopia, Kenya, Sudan, Tanzania, and Uganda.

The Lelwel hartebeest can hybridize with Coke's hartebeest to make the Kenya Highland hartebeest (A. b. lelwel × cokii), or with Swayne's hartebeest to make the Neumann hartebeest (A. b. lelwel × swaynei).

References

Alcelaphus
Mammals described in 1877
Mammals of the Central African Republic
Mammals of Chad
Mammals of the Democratic Republic of the Congo
Mammals of Ethiopia
Mammals of Kenya
Mammals of Tanzania
Mammals of Uganda
Mammals of Sudan
Bovids of Africa